Chakkupallam  is a Grama Panchayat and Village in Idukki district in the Indian state of Kerala. The administrative capital(Panchayat Office) and village center of Chakkupallam Grama Panchayat is Anakkara, located on Kumily-Munnar state highway. The town has a large church, built in 2000.

Demographics
As of 2011 Census, Chakkupallam had a population of 12,609 with 6,254 males and 6,355 females. In Chakkupallam, 10% of the population was under 6 years of age. Chakkupallam had an average literacy of 88% higher than the national average of 74% and lower than state average of 94%.

References

Villages in Idukki district